Critical Mass is an album by American jazz pianist Matthew Shipp which was recorded in 1994 and released on 2.13, a division of the 2.13.61 label, founded by Henry Rollins. Shipp adds violinist Mat Maneri to his usual trio lineup with bassist William Parker and drummer Whit Dickey. Shipp met Maneri when the violinist was just 17 in Boston, this is their first collaboration on record.

Reception

The Penguin Guide to Jazz states "An interesting record but rather dour work for listener." By contrast, in an article for the Boston Phoenix, Norman Weinstein says about the album "This is the most accomplished recording of Shipp's career, a breathtaking summary of his complex sense of musical form and lava-like flow of unstoppable imagination."

Track listing
All compositions by Matthew Shipp
 "Critical Mass" – 10:07
 "Virgin Complex" – 9:11
 "Density and Eucharist" – 21:43

Personnel
Matthew Shipp - piano
Mat Maneri – violin
William Parker – bass
Whit Dickey – drums

References

1995 albums
Matthew Shipp albums
2.13.61 albums